The 543d Aircraft Control and Warning Group is a disbanded United States Air Force unit. It was last assigned to the 31st Air Division, Air Defense Command, stationed at Fort Snelling, Minnesota. It was inactivated on 10 February 1952.

History
The unit was a command and control organization of general surveillance radar squadrons providing for the air defense of the United States. The unit was inactivated due to an ADC reorganization, and its assigned radar squadrons were transferred to various air divisions.

Lineage

 Established as the 543d Aircraft Control and Warning Group
 Activated on 8 October 1950
 Inactivated on 6 February 1952
 Disbanded on 21 September 1984

Assignments
 31st Air Division, 8 October 1950
 Central Air Defense Force, 1 January 1951
 31st Air Division (Defense), 10 July 1951

Stations
 Fort Snelling, Minnesota, 8 October 1950 – 6 February 1952

Subordinate units

 132d Aircraft Control and Warning Squadron (Federalized Minnesota ANG)
 Leaf River, Minnesota, 4 June 1951 – 6 February 1952 
 138th Aircraft Control and Warning Squadron (Federalized Colorado ANG)
 Rapid City AFB, South Dakota, July 1951 – 6 February 1952 
 673d Aircraft Control and Warning Squadron
 Fort Snelling, Minnesota, 8 October 1950 – 6 February 1952
 674th Aircraft Control and Warning Squadron
 Osceola AFS, Wisconsin, 8 October 1950 – 6 February 1952 
 676th Aircraft Control and Warning Squadron
 Antigo AFS, Wisconsin, 1 May 1951 – 6 February 1952 
 756th Aircraft Control and Warning Squadron
 Finland AFS, Minnesota, December 1950 – 6 February 1952 
 785th Aircraft Control and Warning Squadron, 
 Finley AFS, North Dakota, 10 April 1951 – 6 February 1952 

 786th Aircraft Control and Warning Squadron
 Minot AFS, North Dakota, 20 May 1951 – 6 February 1952 
 787th Aircraft Control and Warning Squadron
 Chandler AFS, Minnesota, 27 June 1951 – 6 February 1952 
 788th Aircraft Control and Warning Squadron
 Waverly AFS, Iowa, 10 April 1951 – 6 February 1952 
 789th Aircraft Control and Warning Squadron
 Omaha AFS, Nebraska, 1 May 1951 – 6 February 1952 
 790th Aircraft Control and Warning Squadron
 Kirksville AFS, Missouri, 1 May 1951 – 6 February 1952 
 791st Aircraft Control and Warning Squadron
 Hanna City AFS, Illinois, 10 May – 1 July 1951

See also
 List of United States Air Force aircraft control and warning squadrons

References

 
 Grant, C.L., The Development of Continental Air Defense to 1 September 1954, (1961), USAF Historical Study No. 126

External links

Air control groups of the United States Air Force
Aerospace Defense Command units
1950 establishments in Minnesota
1952 disestablishments in Minnesota